The National Society of Operative Printers and Assistants (NATSOPA) was a British trade union.

History
Formed as part of the New Unionism movement in September 1889, the union was originally named the Printers' Labourers' Union and was led by George Evans.  In 1899, it was renamed the Operative Printers' Assistants Union, and in 1904 it became the National Society of Operative Printers' Assistants, taking the acronym NATSOPA for the first time.  In 1911, it assumed its long-term name, the "National Society of Operative Printers and Assistants".  By this point, it had 4,722 members, and it grew rapidly, having 25,000 members in 92 branches by 1929.

In 1966, the union merged with the National Union of Printing, Bookbinding and Paper Workers, becoming Division 1 of the Society of Graphical and Allied Trades (SOGAT), but in 1970 the failure to agree a common rulebook led to Division 1 leaving to become the National Society of Operative Printers and Media Personnel.  In 1972, it merged with the Sign and Display Trade Union, and in 1982 it again merged with SOGAT, on this occasion the merger proving successful.

Election results
The union sponsored George Isaacs as a Labour Party candidate in each general election and two by-elections between 1918 and 1955.

Leadership

General Secretaries
1889: George Evans
1890: Thomas O'Grady
1897: Michael Vaughan
1898: Eddie Smith
1909: George Isaacs
1948: Harry Good
1951: Richard Briginshaw
1975: Owen O'Brien

Presidents
1889: James Keep
1891: Frederick Quinn
1893: James Keep
1898: Eddie Smith
1899: Harry Cook
1901: J. B. Sullivan
1904: George Cullen
1905: J. B. Sullivan
1907: James Keep
1910: A. Bispham
1917: J. C. Mead
1920: George T. Bevan
1929: William Plunkett

Footnotes

References
Arthur Marsh, Victoria Ryan and John B. Smethurst, Historical Directory of Trade Unions
James Moran, Natsopa: Seventy-five Years

External links
Catalogue of the Natsopa archives, held at the Modern Records Centre, University of Warwick

1889 establishments in the United Kingdom
1975 disestablishments in the United Kingdom
Defunct trade unions of the United Kingdom
Printing trade unions
Trade unions established in 1889
Trade unions disestablished in 1982
Trade unions based in London